Dashun Wang is a Professor of Management and Organizations at the Kellogg School of Management and the McCormick School of Engineering, at Northwestern University since 2016. At Kellogg from 2019, he is the Founding Director of the Center for Science of Science and Innovation (CSSI). He is also a core faculty at the Northwestern Institute on Complex Systems (NICO) and an Adjunct Professor of Department of Physics, at Northeastern University. His current research focus is on Science of Science. Dashun is a recipient of the AFOSR Young Investigator award (2016) and Poets & Quants Best 40 Under 40 Professors (2019).

Career 
In 2007, Dashun earned an undergraduate degree in Physics from Fudan University, Shanghai, China. After that, he earned both a M.Sc and a PhD in physics from Northeastern University. From January 2015 to July 2016, he was an Assistant Professor of College of Information Sciences and Technology at Pennsylvania State University, University Park. He is currently a Professor of Management and Organizations at the Kellogg School of Management and the McCormick School of Engineering, at Northwestern University.

Research 
Dashun’s current research focus is on Science of Science, a quest to turn the scientific methods and curiosities upon ourselves, hoping to use and develop tools from complexity sciences and artificial intelligence to broadly explore the opportunities and promises offered by the recent data explosion in science. His research in this area has received multiple media coverages and has been featured on sources including The New York Times, The Atlantic, etc.

Dashun's research also span across the fields of Computational Social Science, Network Science, Big Data, and Complex Systems. His most cited work, titled "Human mobility, social ties, and link prediction", investigates the correlation between mobility patterns and social proximity, and illustrates the power of mobility patterns in predicting formation of new social connections. Another representative work of Dashun Wang, under the title of "Quantifying long-term scientific impact", centers around citation dynamics of individual papers. In collaboration with Chaoming Song and Albert-László Barabási, Dashun Wang detects a universal temporal pattern of papers and this observed pattern facilitates a better understanding on the underlying processes of scientific impact and provides a reliable citation-based measure of influence.

Dashun Wang's most recent work quantitatively analyzes global policy responses towards the COVID-19 pandemic.

Awards and honors 
In 2014, Dashun received the Invention Achievement Award from IBM Research. In 2016, Dashun is a recipient of the AFOSR Young Investigator award. In 2019, his paper was elected as Top 100 most-discussed papers across all sciences, and he was elected be Poets & Quants Best 40 Under 40 Professors, received Minerva Award from Department of Defense.

Selected publications

Books 

 Dashun Wang and Albert-Laszlo ́ Baraba ́si, The Science of Science. (Cambridge University Press, 2021).

Articles 
 Yian Yin, Jian Gao, Benjamin F. Jones, and Dashun Wang (2021), Coevolution of policy and science during the pandemic Science, 2021.
 Yian Yin, Yang Wang, James A. Evans, and Dashun Wang (2019), Quantifying the dynamics of failure across science, startups, and security, Nature.
 Yang Wang, Benjamin F. Jones, and Dashun Wang (2019), Early-Career Setback and Future Career Impact, Nature Communications.
 Lingfei Wu, Dashun Wang, James A. Evans (2019), Large teams develop and small teams disrupt science and technology. Nature, 2019. [Cover Article]
 Ching Jin, Chaoming Song, Johannes Bjelland, Geoffrey Canright, Dashun Wang (2019), Emergence of Scaling in Complex Substitutive Systems. Nature Human Behaviour. [Cover Article]
 Lu Liu, Yang Wang, Roberta Sinatra, C. Lee Giles, Chaoming Song, and Dashun Wang (2018), Hot Streaks in Artistic, Cultural, and Scientific Careers. Nature.
 Tao Jia‡, Dashun Wang, and Boleslaw K. Szymanski. Quantifying patterns of research-interest evolution. Nature Human Behaviour 1 (2017): 0078.
 Roberta Sinatra, Dashun Wang, Pierre Deville, Chaoming Song, and Albert-La ́szlo ́ Baraba ́si (2016), Quantifying the evolution of individual scientific impact, Science, 354, 6312.
 Pierre Deville, Chaoming Song, Nathan Eagle, Vincent Blondel, Albert-La ́szlo ́ Ba- raba ́si, and Dashun Wang (2016), Scaling identity connects human mobility and social interactions. Proceedings of the National Academy of Sciences.
 Dashun Wang, Chaoming Song†, and Albert-La ́szlo ́ Baraba ́si (2013), Quantifying Longterm Scientific Impact. Science, 342, 6154 (2013): 127-132. [Cover Article]

References 

Year of birth missing (living people)
Living people